Wolfgang Schaper (23 January 1895 – 6 August 1930) was a German sculptor. His work was part of the sculpture event in the art competition at the 1928 Summer Olympics.

References

1895 births
1930 deaths
20th-century German sculptors
20th-century German male artists
German male sculptors
Olympic competitors in art competitions
People from Berlin